KGSO (1410 AM, "Sports Radio 93.9 FM & 1410 AM KGSO") is an American broadcast radio station licensed to serve the community of Wichita, Kansas. The station is owned and operated by Steckline Communications Inc. The station was assigned current call sign "KGSO" by the Federal Communications Commission (FCC) on May 1, 2005.

Programming
KGSO broadcasts a sports format. In addition to its usual mix of local and syndicated programming, KGSO airs local high school sports, Oklahoma Sooners football and the NBC World Series.

Daily programming includes "The Game Plan" from 6-9 a.m. Monday through Friday and is hosted by Doug Downs and Jeremy Heim. From 9-11 a.m., former Wichita State & Major League Baseball player Phil Stephenson, Leon Liebl, and Jeff Akin hosts "In the Zone." In the evening, comedian Felix Johnson and Sasha Bouska host "The Press Box," from 4-6 p.m., the afternoon drive time slot, topping other shows in the area in the same time. The "Saturday Morning Sports Page," which airs Saturday mornings at 7:00 in the fall, usually has a rotating host between the personalities, recaps high school football scores, and previews college and professional football that weekend.

References

External links
 KGSO official website

 
 

GSO
Fox Sports Radio stations
Radio stations established in 1951
1963 establishments in Kansas